Cream Stone is an Indian chain of ice cream parlors, established in 2004. The chain has stores in 16 locations across India. Cream Stone has received multiple food awards, presented by The Times Group and Zomato.

The chain offers a wide range of flavored ice creams, incorporating flavors popular in India such as gulab jamun and lychee fruit. Cream Stone also offers diet options and milkshakes. The company also owns Temptations, which was also established in 2004, which serves starters, chaat, and ice cream.

References

Ice cream parlors